The Warren Opera House Block and Hetherington Block are historic buildings located in Greenfield, Iowa, United States.  They are both 2½-story brick structures. The Opera House block, originally owned by E.E. Warren, is located on the corner and features a corner turret.  It housed Warren's dry goods store and a theatre.  The adjacent commercial block was originally owned by John J. Heatherington, and is similar in style to the Opera House block.  Both buildings feature facades with a tripartite arrangement and center frontispieces that project slightly forward, a broad rock-faced beltcourse that runs above the second floor windows, a narrow metal cornice, and a brick parapet with finials.  The Opera House's parapet has a triangular pediment with "Opera House" on a rectangular base, and the Hetherington Block has a similar feature in a simplified form. The buildings were listed together on the National Register of Historic Places in 1979.  In 2014 they were included as a contributing property in the Greenfield Public Square Historic District.

References

External links
Hotel Greenfield

Commercial buildings completed in 1896
Romanesque Revival architecture in Iowa
Greenfield, Iowa
Buildings and structures in Adair County, Iowa
National Register of Historic Places in Adair County, Iowa
Commercial buildings on the National Register of Historic Places in Iowa
Theatres on the National Register of Historic Places in Iowa
Individually listed contributing properties to historic districts on the National Register in Iowa